Willi Glasauer (born 9 December 1938 in Stříbro) is a German illustrator of books for children.

References

Living people
1938 births
German illustrators
People from Stříbro
German children's book illustrators
20th-century German artists